The Fort Bragg Game was a Major League Baseball (MLB) game played between the Miami Marlins and Atlanta Braves of MLB's National League at Fort Bragg Stadium in Fort Bragg, North Carolina, on July 3, 2016. The game was broadcast on Sunday Night Baseball on ESPN. The game was the first regular season professional sports event ever held on an active military base, and the first MLB game played in North Carolina. The Marlins defeated the Braves, 5–2. After the game, the grandstands were removed, and the field became a multi-use sporting ground.

Background

In 2015, Major League Baseball (MLB) approached the United States Department of Defense with an idea to host a regular season MLB game at a military base. The following March, MLB Commissioner Rob Manfred publicly announced that the Miami Marlins and Atlanta Braves would play a regular season game at Fort Bragg on July 3, 2016, the day before Independence Day, to honor the nation's military. MLB and the MLB Players Association spent $5 million to convert an unused golf course on the base into a stadium with a capacity of 12,500. Tickets for the game were free to military personnel and their families through a lottery system.

The Fort Bragg Game became the first regular season professional sporting event to ever be held on an active military base, and the first MLB regular season game ever held in the state of North Carolina. The game aired on ESPN as part of their Sunday Night Baseball coverage. Dan Shulman provided play-by-play, while Jessica Mendoza and Aaron Boone served as analysts and Buster Olney as a game reporter. ESPN also distributed the game on ESPN Radio, ESPN Deportes, and ESPN Deportes Radio.

Before the game, players visited the Womack Army Medical Center. Manfred, Joe Torre, and MLBPA Director Tony Clark visited the local Fisher House. A baseball clinic for over 200 children was held on July 2. After the game, the grounds was converted into a softball field and multipurpose recreational complex for active duty personnel.

Game
MLB allowed each team to carry an additional position player on their active roster; the Braves called up Ronnier Mustelier from the Triple-A Gwinnett Braves, while the Marlins called up Yefri Pérez from the Double-A Jacksonville Suns. Neither player appeared in the game and Mustelier never played in a game in Major League Baseball.

Recap

The Braves served as the home team, while the Marlins were the visitors. Adam Conley was the starting pitcher for Miami, and Matt Wisler started for Atlanta. The game was scoreless through four innings. In the fifth inning, Adeiny Hechavarria hit a triple and scored on a run batted in (RBI) single by J. T. Realmuto. Realmuto scored after singles by Martín Prado and Christian Yelich. The Braves had the bases loaded in the fifth inning, but failed to score.

The Marlins scored three more runs in the final innings; Realmuto scored on an RBI single by Prado in the seventh inning, Giancarlo Stanton hit a triple in the eighth inning and scored on a sacrifice fly hit by Derek Dietrich, and Realmuto hit a home run in the ninth inning. The Braves scored two runs in the bottom of the ninth inning when Erick Aybar had an RBI double that scored Tyler Flowers, and A. J. Pierzynski hit a sacrifice fly that scored Jeff Francoeur, but were unable to narrow the gap further. The win increased Miami's win–loss record to 43–39 ( winning percentage),  games behind the Washington Nationals in the National League East and  games out of a wild card slot. The loss dropped the Braves to 28–54, the worst record in MLB.

Line score

Box score

Pitching

Pitching

Zack Hample controversy
Zack Hample, a baseball collector who is not active duty military personnel, sought a ticket to the game on social media, offering to pay up to $1,000 for a ticket. After he came under widespread criticism for taking a ticket to a game that was meant for military personnel, Hample quickly announced that he would donate $100 for every ball he collected to a charity for military veterans. Hample claimed to have caught 11 balls and claimed he would donate $1,100 to AMVETS. He posted a lengthy apology on Twitter, which CBS sportswriter Mike Axisa stated "boils down to 'I'm sorry but I really wanted to go.'"

See also
List of neutral site regular season Major League Baseball games played in the United States and Canada

References

External links

Major League Baseball games
2016 Major League Baseball season
2016 in sports in North Carolina
July 2016 sports events in the United States
Fayetteville, North Carolina metropolitan area
Atlanta Braves
Miami Marlins
Nicknamed sporting events